Aramus paludigrus is an extinct species of limpkin, semi-aquatic birds related to cranes (order Gruiformes), which are similar. Aramus paludigrus was found in the famous Konzentrat-Lagerstätte of the Honda Group at La Venta, dating from the mid-Miocene period, in central Colombia.

Description 
It also differs from the modern species in which this bone has larger lateral condyles, the axis of the bone is longer and narrower, very similar to that found in modern trumpeters (Psophia). The general structure of this animal should not very different from the modern limpkins, being a rather sedentary bird (no remains are known from other parts of South America), and what is known of the strata in which he found, had to wade through swamps in search of snails, insects and bivalves to feed on them, that led to their scientific name, as in Greek paludigrus can be translated as "marsh crane."

See also 

 Honda Group

References 

Gruiformes
Miocene birds of South America
Laventan
Neogene Colombia
Fossils of Colombia
Honda Group, Colombia
Fossil taxa described in 1997